Samuel Caldwell may refer to:

 Samuel H. Caldwell (1904–1960), American electrical engineer
 Samuel R. Caldwell (1880–1941), first American citizen convicted under the 1937 Marijuana Tax Act
 Sam Caldwell (1892–1953), American oilman and Louisiana politician

See also
 Samuel Caldwell House, located in Caldwell, Ohio